Tsuvan (also known as Matsuvan, Motsuvan, Terki, Telaki, Teleki, Tchede) is an Afro-Asiatic language spoken in Cameroon in Far North Province.

Tsuvan is spoken in the village (in fact, the massif) of Téléki by a group known as the Tchédé, who are often classified with the Gude. It is spoken east of the canton of Tchévi, commune of Bourrha, department of Mayo-Tsanaga, Far North Region. Like Sharwa, it is also spoken the Northern Region, in the department of Mayo-Louti (commune of Mayo-Oulo). There are 2,300 speakers.

Notes 

Biu-Mandara languages
Languages of Cameroon